Fondulac Township is located in Tazewell County, Illinois. As of the 2010 census, its population was 13,381 and it contained 6,099 housing units.

Geography

Demographics

References

External links
City-data.com
Illinois State Archives

Townships in Tazewell County, Illinois
Peoria metropolitan area, Illinois
Populated places established in 1849
Townships in Illinois
1849 establishments in Illinois